The Royal Society Range is a mountain range in Victoria Land, Antarctica. Mount Lister is located along the western shore of McMurdo Sound between the Koettlitz, Skelton and Ferrar glaciers. Other notable local terrain features include Allison Glacier, which descends from the west slopes of the Royal Society Range into Skelton Glacier.

Discovery and naming

The range was probably first seen by Captain James Clark Ross in 1841.

The range was explored by the British National Antarctic Expedition (BrNAE) under Robert Falcon Scott, who named the range after the Royal Society and applied names of its members to many of its peaks. For example, Mount Lister was named for Lord Joseph Lister, President of the Royal Society, 1895–1900. The Royal Society provided financial support to the expedition and its members had assisted on the committee which organized the expedition.

Geology

The Royal Society Range consists of a Precambrian igneous and meta-igneous basement complex overlain by Devonian- to Triassic-age sandstones, siltstones and conglomerates of the Beacon Supergroup which dip shallowly westward away from the Ross Sea coast. The entire region is cut by north–south trending longitudinal faults, east–west trending transverse faults, and structurally related dike swarms.

Tectonic and fluvial activity have featured very heavily in the recent geologic history of the Royal Society Range. Following the extension of the Ross Sea Basin (c. 55 million years ago), an episode of uplift drove the creation of the Royal Society Range rift flank. At this time a tectonic (though not accretionary) wedge, up to 6 km thick on the coast, was present, though it quickly began to erode due primarily to fluvial processes, and the Royal Society Range was cut down near to its present appearance by the mid-Miocene. Relatively limited glacial action since that time has preserved much of the fluvial architecture of the Range, and though uplift did not cease, its magnitude is such that it has not drastically affected the landscape, having progressed only 67 meters in the last 8 million years.

Koettlitz Glacier Alkaline Province
Neoproterozoic tectonic extension along the edge of the East Antarctic Craton between the Skelton and Koettlitz Glaciers resulted in the emplacement of coarse grained alkaline igneous intrusive rocks (ranging from gabbro to A-type granite). This area of alkaline intrusives is referred to as the Koettlitz Glacier Alkaline Province

Ross Orogeny

Cambrian tectonic convergence, continental collision and plate subduction led to the emplacement of calc-alkaline and adakitic granitoids. This period of mountain building is referred to as the Ross Orogeny.

Volcanic history
The Royal Society Range contains over 50 basaltic vents, ranging in size from tiny mounds to cinder cones up to 300 meters (985 feet) high. Dating of surface material indicates they were active earlier than 15 million years ago (e.g. Heald Island) and as recently as 80,000 years ago, with glacier-bound tephra layers suggesting even more recent Holocene activity. The vast majority of vents are located in the foothills of the Royal Society mountains just north of Koettlitz Glacier, and most are Quaternary in age. Most emanating flows are 3–10 meters thick and less than 4 kilometers long. The composition, with very few exceptions, is porphyritic basanite with primarily olivine and clinopyroxene phenocrysts, though some phenocrystic plagioclase is also present.

Features

 Abbott Spur
 Allison Glacier
 Amphitheatre Glacier
 Anne Hill
 Auster Pass
 Ball Glacier
 Baronick Glacier
 Battleship
 Berry Spur
 Bindschadler Glacier
 Bishop Peak
 Boom Basin
 Borg Bastion
 Brandau Crater
 Bubble Spur
 Carleton Glacier
 Cathedral Rocks
 Chancellor Ridge
 Chaplains Tableland
 Columnar Valley
 Comberiate Glacier
 Copland Pass
 Covert Glacier
 Craw Ridge
 Dale Glacier
 Dot Cliff
 Dromedary Glacier
 Emmanuel Glacier
 Engebretson Peak
 Ferrar Glacier
 Fisher Bastion
 Fogle Peak
 Foster Glacier
 Frio Peak
 Frostbite Spine
 Harvey Summit
 Heke Peak
 Henderson Pyramid
 Highway Ridge
 Hofmann Spur
 Hooker Glacier
 Hooper Crags
 Horseshoe Crater
 Howchin Glacier
 Ibarra Peak
 Inan Peak
 Jezek Glacier
 Jigsaw Rock Gut
 Johns Hopkins Ridge
 Joseph Lister
 Kamb Glacier
 Kenney Nunatak
 Koettlitz Glacier
 Lava Tongue Pass
 Lettau Peak
 Lister Glacier
 Lower Jaw Glacier
 Maine Ridge
 Margaret Hill
 Matataua Glacier
 Mata Taua Peak
 McConchie Ridge
 McDermott Glacier
 McMurdo Dry Valleys
 Mitchell Glacier
 Mount Bockheim
 Mount Chiang
 Mount Cocks
 Mount Duvall
 Mount Essinger
 Mount Fuller
 Mount Hooker
 Mount Huggins
 Mount Huxle
 Mount Kempe
 Mount Lisicky
 Mount Lister
 Mount Mignone
 Mount Moxley
 Mount Rucker
 Mount Schwerdtfeger
 Mount Stearns
 Mount Windle
 Murcray Heights
 Murihau Peak
 Navajo Butte
 Pearsall Ridge
 Platform Spur
 Potter Glacier
 Poutini Peak
 Puke Toropa Mountain
 Radian Glacier
 Rampart Ridge
 Rester Peak
 Royal Society
 Rucker Ridge
 Rutgers Glacier
 Salient Glacier
 Salient Peak
 Salient Ridge
 Shupe Peak
 Skelton Glacier
 Skelton Névé
 Sladen Summit
 Solomon Glacier
 Solomon Saddle
 Sphinx Valley
 Spring Glacier
 Stoner Peak
 Tasman Ridge
 Terminus Mountain
 The Pimple
 Transit Ridge
 Tuati Peak
 Umran Inan
 Waiparahoaka Mountain
 Walcott Glacier
 Ward Glacier
 Ward Lake
 Wirdnam Glacier

See also
List of volcanoes in Antarctica
List of Ultras of Antarctica
List of islands by highest point

References

External links

 
Scott Coast
Volcanoes of Victoria Land
Cenozoic volcanism